Carmenta arizonae is a moth of the family Sesiidae. It was described by William Beutenmüller in 1898. It is known from the US state of Arizona.

References

External links
Moth Photographers Group at Mississippi State University

Sesiidae
Moths described in 1898